The Milwaukee School of Languages (MSL) is a 6–12 grade public school in the Milwaukee Public Schools district of Wisconsin, United States. It was formerly named the Wilbur Wright Multi-Language Middle School.

In addition to common core standards, students participate in immersion programs in Spanish, German, and French. Students can also take a partial immersion program in Spanish. Courses are also offered in Japanese.

This school welcomes many exchange students from all over the world every year.

History
Wilbur Wright middle school was constructed in 1956.

The school first offered immersion programs for middle school students in 1986, and added high school grades in 1996.

Extracurricular Activities, Sports & Clubs 
MSL offers many different Clubs and Extracurricular Activities.

Clubs 
Chess Club (Only available if done at previous immersion school)

(Forensics) Speech & Debate

Newspaper

Theater

Gender Sexuality Alliance (Known as GSA among students)

Environmental Club

Art Club (Highschool-Only with exceptions)

Jazz Club (Highschool-Only)

Extracurricular Activities 
Special Olympics

Girl Scouts (Only available if done at previous immersion school)

Pearls For Teen Girls

Sports 
Track & Field (Separate Girl and Boys Team)

Cross Country (Separate Girl and Boys Team)

Basketball (Separate Girl and Boys Team)

Volleyball (Co-ed)

Soccer (Co-ed)

Students
Milwaukee School of Languages has an ethnically diverse student body as of 2022:
 Black or African American, 49.4%
 White, 23.3%
 Hispanic/Latino, 18.7%
 Asian, 4.6%
 Two or more Races, 3.6%
 American Indian or Alaskan Native, 0.2%
 Native Hawaiian or Other Pacific Islander, 0.2%
53% of students are female while 47% were men.

Athletics and Activities
In 2007, the MSL Boys Track and Field team won the WIAA D1 state title. Alumnus such as Quentin Luttrell, Zachary Sharkey-Ketner, Jonathan Fobbs and Antwon Terry led the team to victory.

Notable alumni 

 Jade-Lianna Peters, actress, voice of Kai-Lan of Ni Hao, Kai-Lan
Josiah Williams, Christian Hip-Hop Artist / Rhythmic Soul | WWE On-Air Talent for the NXT Creator of Wrestle and Flow.
Buffalo Nichols, blues guitarist & singer
Zed Kenzo, Milwaukee area rapper, winner of 2019 Radio Milwaukee Music Awards

See also
 Milwaukee Public Schools

References

External links
 Official website

Public middle schools in Wisconsin
Public high schools in Wisconsin
High schools in Milwaukee